Ross William Norman  (born 7 January 1959) is a former professional squash player from New Zealand. He is best remembered for winning the World Open in 1986, when he beat Jahangir Khan of Pakistan in the final 9-5, 9-7, 7-9, 9-1. The win marked the end of an unbeaten run for Khan that had stretched for over five years (the longest in the history of professional sport). Norman had been ranked the World No. 2 behind Khan for some time going into the match, but despite a single-minded determination to end his unbeaten run had been unable to end the total dominance that the Pakistani had held over the game. Norman had vowed: "One day Jahangir will be slightly off his game and I will get him." That day finally came in the final of squash's biggest tournament, which was held that year in Toulouse, France.

Norman retired from the professional squash circuit in 1995, but has remained active in seniors events. He now has two sons, Brett and Alex.

In the 2014 New Year Honours, Norman was appointed a Member of the New Zealand Order of Merit for services to squash.

References

External links
Profile at Squash New Zealand website

New Zealand male squash players
1959 births
Living people
People from Whitianga
People from Sunningdale
Members of the New Zealand Order of Merit
Sportspeople from the Bay of Plenty Region
Sportspeople from Waikato